Scorpion Hollow is a small, unincorporated community in White County, Georgia, United States. Alternate Georgia State Route 75 runs through the community.

References

Unincorporated communities in White County, Georgia
Unincorporated communities in Georgia (U.S. state)